Chard deNiord is an American author, Poet Laureate of Vermont (2015–2019), poet, and teacher. He lives in Westminster West, Vermont with his wife Liz.

Chard deNiord is the author of seven poetry collections Asleep in the Fire (1990), Sharp Golden Thorn (2003), Night Mowing (2005), The Double Truth (2011), Speaking In Turn (2011) a collaboration with Tony Sanders, Interstate (2015), and In My Unknowing (2020). His book Sad Friends, Drowned Lovers, Stapled Songs (2011) is a collection of interviews with seven eminent American poets, including Robert Bly, Lucille Clifton, Jack Gilbert, Donald Hall, Galway Kinnell, Maxine Kumin, and Ruth Stone. His second book of interviews from The University of Pittsburgh Press titled "I Would Lie To You If I Could: Interviews with Ten American Poets", (2018) includes interviews with Natasha Thretheway, Jane Hirshfield, Martin Espada, Steven Kuusisto, Stephen Sandy, Ed Ochester, Carolyn Forche, Peter Everwine, Galway Kinnell and James Wright's widow, Anne Wright.

DeNiord was born on December 17, 1952, in New Haven, Connecticut. He was raised in Lynchburg, Virginia, where he attended Lynchburg College, earning a BA in religious studies. He later received a Master of Divinity from Yale Divinity School, and a Master of Fine Arts from the Iowa Writers' Workshop.

A Professor Emeritus at Providence College in Providence, Rhode Island, deNiord has been a Poetry Fellow at the Sewanee Writers' Conference and the Allan Collins Scholar in Poetry at the Bread Loaf Writers' Conference.

DeNiord is the co founder with Tom Lux and Jacqueline Gens of the Spirit and the Letter Workshop, a ten-day program of workshops and lectures in Patzquaro, Mexico. He also co-founded with Jacqueline Gens the New England College Master of Fine Arts program in poetry.  

He is a recipient of a Pushcart Prize, and his poems have been included in the anthologies Pushcart Prize XXII (1998), Best American Poetry (1999), Best of the Prose Poem (2000), American Religious Poems (2006), and American Poetry Now (2007).

In 2015, DeNiord was named the Vermont State Poet Laureate and served for four years. In 2022, he was named a Fellow of Vermont's Academy of Arts and Sciences. He is a board member at the Sundog Poetry Center and essay editor at Plume Poetry Journal.

References

Iowa Writers' Workshop alumni
Kent School alumni
University of Lynchburg alumni
Writers from New Haven, Connecticut
Poets from Vermont
Poets Laureate of Vermont
Providence College faculty
Yale Divinity School alumni
Living people
1952 births